Braatz is a surname. Notable people with the surname include:

Richard D. Braatz (born 1966), American academic
Tom Braatz (1933–2018), American football player and executive